ZRP may refer to: 

 Zimbabwe Republic Police
 Zone Routing Protocol in networking
 Zatlers' Reform Party, Latvia